This is a list of the weekly Canadian number one singles of 1964. Prior to June 1964, the primary national pop chart was the CHUM Chart, from Top 40 radio station CHUM in Toronto, Ontario; in June, the new magazine RPM was launched as a national record chart compiling results from individual stations across Canada including CHUM.

CHUM Chart

RPM

See also

1964 in Canadian music

References

1964 in Canadian music
Canada
1964